Sabarmatee Tiki (born ) is an Indian conservationist and farmer living near to Bhubaneswar in the state of Odisha. With her father she runs a non-governmental organization called Sambhav which promotes organic farming and runs seed swaps. The achievements of Tiki were recognised in 2018, when she received the Nari Shakti Puraskar and in 2020 with the Padma Shri.

Career

Tiki was born . She lives in the Nayagarh district, near to Bhubaneswar in the state of Odisha in India. Her father Radha Mohan bought land in the 1980s that was a wasteland. Using organic farming techniques, father and daughter rejuvenated the land after three years. They then took on more land, building up to 90 acres. Amongst other things they grow clove bean, jack bean, sword bean and black rice. Together they set up a non-governmental organization (NGO) called Sambhav which promotes organic farming and seed exchanges. She left her job at Oxfam in 1993 in order to work full-time for Sambhav. 

By 2021, Sambhav had collected 500 seed varieties for preservation. It holds training days and runs an annual Seed Festival. The NGO has partnered with a self-help group called Ma Saraswati to promote women's rights and environmental causes in local villages. It promotes the System of Rice Intensification (SRI) which is designed to maximise rice yields and according to Tiki also makes the labour process easier for women working in the paddy fields.

Awards and recognition

The work of Tiki was recognised in 2018, when she received the Nari Shakti Puraskar, India's highest civil award for women.
In 2020, she received the Padma Shri alongside her father in recognition of their decades long promotion of conservation and organic farming. Minister Piyush Goyal said the two were "unsung heroes".

Selected works

References

1960s births
Indian farmers
Indian women farmers
People from Nayagarh district
Nari Shakti Puraskar winners
Padma Shri Award
Indian conservationists
Indian landowners
Indian women activists
Living people